The following is a timeline of the history of the municipality of Eindhoven, Netherlands.

Prior to 20th century

 1232 - Town rights bestowed by Henry I, Duke of Brabant.
 1420 - Castle built.
 1486 - 19 March: .
 1554 - Fire.
 1583 - Siege of Eindhoven (1583).
 1629 - Eindhoven becomes part of the Netherlands.
 1771 -  established.
 1791 - Population: 1,785.
 1815 - Population: 2,310.
 1846 - Eindhoven Canal dug.
 1866
 Eindhoven railway station opens.
 Synagogue built.
 1867 -  rebuilt.
 1869 - Town Hall built.
 1880 -  built.
 1891 - Philips in business.
 1897 -  begins operating.
 1898 -  built.
 1900 - Population: 4,730.

20th century
 1904 -  (square) laid out.
 1909
 FC Eindhoven (football club) formed.
 1910 - Philips Stadion (stadium) opens.
 1911 - Eindhovens Dagblad (newspaper) begins publication.
 1913 - PSV Eindhoven (football club) formed.
 1920
 Gestel, Stratum, Strijp, Tongelre, and Woensel become part of the municipality of Eindhoven.
 Population: 47,946.
 1921 -  built.
 1931 -  built.
 1932
 Welschap Airfield begins operating.
 DAF Trucks in business.
 1935 - Population: 103,030.
 1936 - Van Abbemuseum opens.
 1937 -  opens.
 1939 -  neighborhood developed.
 1942 - December: Aerial bombing by Allied forces.
 1944 - September: City besieged by Allied forces.
 1945 - Het Vrije Volk newspaper begins publication.
 1947 - Design Academy Eindhoven established.
 1955 - Population: 154,604.
 1956
 Eindhoven railway station rebuilt.
 Eindhoven University of Technology established.
 1959
 Eindhoven Marathon begins.
 Herman Witte becomes mayor.
 1964
  opens.
  built.
 1966 - The futuristic Evoluon science museum was built.
 1967 - City Hall rebuilt.
 1969 - Student centre  built.
 1970 - De Bijenkorf department store built.
 1971 - Effenaar youth centre established.
 1976 - Administrative entity for the Eindhoven agglomeration created.
 1979 - Gilles Borrie becomes mayor.
 1980 - Het Apollohuis cultural venue established.
 1984 - Eindhoven Airport terminal built.
 1985 - May: Catholic pope visits city.
 1992
 Muziekgebouw Frits Philips (concert hall) opens.
 Rein Welschen becomes mayor.
 1993 - Holland Casino branch in business.
 1996 - 15 July: 1996 Belgian Air Force Hercules accident occurs at Eindhoven Airport.
 1997
 Philips headquarters relocated to Amsterdam.
 Jan Louwers Stadion (stadium) in use.
 1999 -  hi-rise built.
 2000
 UEFA Euro 2000 football contest held.
 Population: 203,433.

21st century

 2001 - City joins regional BrabantStad group.
 2002
 Leefbaar Eindhoven political party active.
 Dutch Design Week begins.
 Avant-Garde van Groeninge restaurant in business.
 2003
  active.
  hi-rise built.
 2004 - Inkijkmuseum opens.
 2006
 Glow Festival Eindhoven begins.
 , Porthos, and Vesteda Toren hi-rises built.
 2008
  built.
 Rob van Gijzel becomes mayor.
 Automotive  event held.
 2009 -  redevelopment begins (approximate date).
 2010
 Admirant shopping centre's "Blob" building constructed.
 Piet Hein Eek studio in business.
 2012 -  built.
 2014 - 19 March: Dutch municipal elections, 2014 held.
 2015 - Population: 223,220 city; 753,426 metro region.

See also
 Eindhoven history
 
 List of mayors of Eindhoven
 
 Timelines of other municipalities in the Netherlands: Amsterdam, Breda, Delft, Groningen, Haarlem, The Hague, 's-Hertogenbosch, Leiden, Maastricht, Nijmegen, Rotterdam, Utrecht

References

This article incorporates information from the Dutch Wikipedia.

Bibliography

in Dutch
  1887-1888

External links

 Europeana. Items related to Eindhoven, various dates.
 Digital Public Library of America. Items related to Eindhoven, various dates

Eindhoven
Years in the Netherlands
History of Eindhoven